The 18th annual Nuestra Belleza México pageant, was held at the Centro Internacional de Convenciones of Puerto Vallarta, Jalisco, Mexico on August 20, 2011. Thirty-four contestants of the Mexican Republic competed for the national title, which was won by Karina González from Aguascalientes who later competed in Miss Universe 2012 in United States where she was a Semifinalist in the Top 10. González was crowned by outgoing Nuestra Belleza México titleholder Karin Ontiveros and Ximena Navarrete Miss Universe 2010. She was the first Hidrocalida to win this title.

The Nuestra Belleza Mundo México title was won by Mariana Berumen from Guanajuato who later competed in Miss World 2012 in China where she was a semifinalist in the Top 15. Berumen was crowned by outgoing Nuestra Belleza Mundo México titleholder Gabriela Palacio and Ximena Navarrete Miss Universe 2010. She was the second Guanajuatense to win this title.

Jessica García Formenti from Baja California Sur was designated by the Nuestra Belleza México Organization as Nuestra Belleza Internacional México 2012. She competed in Miss International 2012 in Japan where she was a semifinalist in the Top 15. She was the second Sudcaliforniana to win this title.

The recognition "Corona al Mérito 2011" was for Jacqueline Bracamontes, Nuestra Belleza México 2000 and actress.

Results

Placements

Order of announcements

Top 15
Distrito Federal
Aguascalientes
Durango
Sinaloa
Jalisco
Sinaloa
Sonora
Baja California Sur
Morelos
Chiapas
Nuevo León
Aguascalientes
Sonora
Guanajuato
Estado de México

Top 10
Estado de México
Sinaloa
Sonora
Aguascalientes
Sonora
Aguascalientes
Sinaloa
Jalisco
Guanajuato
Distrito Federal

Top 5
Estado de México
Aguascalientes
Guanajuato
Sinaloa
Jalisco

Preliminary competition
The Preliminary Competition was held at the Centro Internacional de Convenciones of Puerto Vallarta, Jalisco, Mexico a few days before to Final Competition. Prior to the final telecast, all contestants competed in swimsuit and evening gown as part of the selection for the others top 10 finalists who were revealed during the beginning of the two-hour live telecast of the Nuestra Belleza México 2011 Pageant live on Televisa on Saturday, August 20.

The Preliminary Competition was hosted by Karin Ontiveros and Jan.

The musical part was enlivened by: Telefunka.

National costume competition
In this competition the contestants are not evaluated, only the costumes. It is a competition showing the country's wealth embodied in the colorful and fascinating costumes made by Mexican designers combining the past and present of Mexico.

For the Nuestra Belleza México Organization this event is very important because it discloses the creative work of the great Mexican designers and also elects the costume to represent Mexico in Miss Universe the next year. Also, some costumes are elected to represent Mexico in other beauty contests.

The winning costume designer receives the "Aguja Diamante Award"

  – "Viñedos Fiesta San Marcos"
  – "Oasis Bajacaliforniano"
  – "Linda Chiapaneca" (Competed in Miss International 2011)
  – "Serpiente Emplumada"
  – "Doncella Maya"
  – "Jimadora, Raíces de Nuestra Tierra"
  – "Tiempo de Tradición"
  – "Diosa de la Plata" (1st Runner-up in Miss Universe 2012)

  – "Fiesta, Danza y Tradiciones"
  – "Escaramuza Charra"
  – "Flor Tehuana"
  – "Nuestra Herencia"
  – "Ángel Azteca" (Competed in Reina Hispanoamericana 2011)
  – "Amor Mestizo"
  – "Tesoro Totonaca"
  – "La Cultura Maya Vive"

Special awards

Judges
They were the same judges at the Preliminary and Final Competition.
 Luis Moya – Dermatologist
 Maru Ruíz de Icaza – Editor
 Arturo Velasco – Televisa Music Director
 Dafne Molina – Nuestra Belleza Mundo México 2004
 Dr. José Abel de la Peña- Plastic Surgeon
 Jordi Avendaño – Photographer
 Aurora Valle – Television Hostess & Journalist
 Juan José Origel – Journalist
 Gabriel Soto – El Modelo México 1996 & Actor

Background music
 Opening Number: "La Vida es una Pasarela" by Bianca Marroquín
 Intermediate: "Respira" by Luis Fonsi
 Swimsuit Competition: "Chocolate" by Telefunka
 Honored to Ximena Navarrete: "Dios Mío, Qué Mujer" by Joan Sebastián
 Evening Gown Competition: "Moneymoon" by Telefunka
 Crowning Moment: "Nuestra Belleza" (Official Theme)

Contestants

Designates
  – Gabriela Delgado
  – Ángela Cantú
  – Paloma Llanes
  – Paulina Burrola

Returning states

 Last competed in 2008:
 

 Last competed in 2009:
   Estado de México

Withdrawals

Significance
 Aguascalientes won the Nuestra Belleza México title for the first time.
 This year the crown of Nuestra Belleza México suffers his seventh change, this new model continues today.
 Guanajuato won the Nuestra Belleza Mundo México title for the second time (before 1998).
 This year the crown of Nuestra Belleza Mundo México suffers his fourth change, this new model continues today.
 Baja California Sur was appointed as Nuestra Belleza Internacional México for the second time (before 2010).
 This year the crown of Nuestra Belleza Internacional México suffers his second change, this new model continues today.
Estado de México was the Suplente/1st Runner-up for the first time
 In this edition Ximena Navarrete Miss Universe 2010 was Honored.
 Estado de México and Quintana Roo returns to competition after two years (2009) and Hidalgo return to competition after three years (2008).
 Jalisco was placed for the eighth consecutive year in the Top 5.
 Aguascalientes was placed for the second consecutive year in the Top 5.
 Jalisco and Nuevo León were placed for the ninth consecutive year.
 Sonora was placed for the sixth consecutive year.
 Aguascalientes and Sinaloa were placed for the fourth consecutive year.
 Distrito Federal was placed for the third consecutive year.
 Morelos and Baja California Sur were placed for the second consecutive year.
 Durango returned to making calls to the semi-finals after six years (2005), Guanajuato after three years (2008) and Chiapas and Estado de México after two years (2009).
 States that were called to the semi-finals last year and this year failed to qualify were Coahuila, Yucatán, Tamaulipas and Veracruz.
 Aguascalientes won Miss Talent and Steps to Fame Award for the first time.
 Distrito Federal won Miss Sports for the third time (before 2006 and 2007).
 Durango won the Academic Award and Best National Costume for the first time.
 Jalisco won Miss Top Model and Personality Fraiche Award for the first time.
 Sinaloa won Contestants' Choice for the second time (before 2008).
 The host delegate, Lucía Silva from Jalisco, won fourth place.
 For the first time Javier Poza hosted the pageant with Jacqueline Bracamontes who was her fifth time.
 Aguascalientes (Gabriela Delgado), Campeche (Karla Buenfil), Nuevo León (Ángela Cantú) and Tamaulipas (Karen Lizcano) are the tallest delegates in this edition (1.80 m).
 Nayarit (Linda Ugarte), San Luis Potosí (Lorena Alvarado), Sinaloa (Paloma Llanes) and Yucatán (Jessica Duarte) are the shortest delegates in this edition (1.70 m).
 Delegates from Campeche, Colima, Chihuahua, Distrito Federal, Hidalgo, Morelos and Tabasco were elected by designation.
 Estado de México's contest held after 10 years of sending candidates for appointment.

Contestant notes
  – Karina González was Reina Nacional de la Feria de San Marcos 2010. Represented Mexico at the Miss Universe 2012 competition held in Las Vegas, Nevada, US on December 19, 2012. She was one of the favorites prior to the coronation night. She placed in the Top 16 and advanced further to the Top 10, wearing a resplendent red evening gown with generous slit. The design of the gown she wore was reminiscent of what Miss Universe 2010 and fellow Mexican Ximena Navarrete wore when she was crowned in Las Vegas, Nevada.
  – Jessica García Formenti was Miss Earth Baja California Sur 2009 and she obtained the title of Miss Water (2nd Runner-up) in the national contest of Miss Earth México 2009 in Mérida, Yucatán. She is cousin of Yaneth García Formenti Miss Earth Baja California Sur 2010, Miss Water (2nd Runner-up) in Miss Earth México 2010 and Miss América Latina México 2011, 4th Runner-up in Miss Latin America 2011. She was selected to compete in Miss International 2012 and was a semi-finalist in the Top 15. Jessica García Formenti is the sister of the husband of Karen Higuera.
  – Diana Ávila was  2nd Runner-up at Nuestra Belleza Coahuila 2010.
  – Ana Karen Martínez fell on stage in evening gown competition in the semi-final night of the contest.
  Estado de México – Nohemí Hermosillo was part of the contestants of Mexico's Next Top Model first cycle (2009) and she obtained the second place in the final competition. She is from Jalisco. She works as a model with Apple Model Management in Bangkok, Thailand.
  – Mariana Berumen was born in Jalostotitlán, Jalisco but she moved to León, Guanajuato from an early age, represented Mexico at Miss World 2012 pageant held in Ordos City, Inner Mongolia, China. She was one of the favorites prior to the coronation night. She placed in the Top 20 at Miss World Beach Beauty, 2nd Runner-up at Miss World Top Model, Top 10 at Beauty with a Purpose and 1st Runner-up at Multimedia Award. At the final night she only placed in the Top 15. Actually she works as a Model and was the 1st Runner-up of Mexico's Next Top Model 2014.
  – Lili Rosales was born in Tequila, Jalisco. She was elected to compete in Reina Hispanoamericana 2011 held in Santa Cruz, Bolivia on October 27, 2011. She was in the Top 5 of the National Costume competition, but she didn't place.
  – Siri Mazari was Miss Earth Morelos 2009 and she obtained the title of Miss Fire (3rd Runner-up) in the national contest of Miss Earth México 2009 in Mérida, Yucatán. Actually is a professional Model. She is daughter of Maria del Jesus Mazari Señorita Morelos 1980.
  – Ángela Cantú was Señorita UANL 2009 in her university when she was studying dentistry. Also she is a professional model. 
  – Ivette García is a runner and specializes in the 200 m. and 400 m. dash. She was part of the Mexican Team who competed in the 2010 IAAF World Championships in Athletics in the 4x400 relay team. She was the 1st Runner-up in Elite Model Look Monterrey 2009.
  – Valery Gantert is of Spanish parents.
  – Paloma Llanes was elected to compete in Miss Mesoamerica International 2015 and won the Title.
  – Laura Palacio is sister of Elizabeth Palacio Nuestra Belleza Sonora 2002. Also she was elected Miss Earth Sonora 2011 in the 2010 edition of Miss Earth Sonora but she did not participate in Miss Earth México 2011 because also was elected Nuestra Belleza Sonora 2011 and participated in the 2011 edition of Nuestra Belleza México and was a Semi-finalist in the Top 10.
  – Karen Lizcano was designated as Miss Petite Universe Tamaulipas 2015 obtained the right to represent Tamaulipas in the Miss Petite Universe México 2015 pageant.
  – Jéssica Duarte came out in the semi-final stage with a splint on her left arm after the arm was injured in the concentration.

Crossovers

Contestants who have competed or will compete at other beauty pageants:

Miss Universe
 2012: : Karina González (Top 10)

Miss World
 2012: : Mariana Berumen (Top 15)

Miss International
 2012: : Jessica García Formenti (Top 15)

Reina Hispanoamericana
 2011: : Lili Rosales

Mexico's Next Top Model
 2009:  Estado de México: Nohemí Hermosillo (1st Runner-up)
 2014: : Mariana Berumen (1st Runner-up)

Miss Earth México
 2009: : Jessica García Formenti (Miss Water/2nd Runner-up)
 2009: : Siri Mazari (Miss Fire/3rd Runner-up)

Miss Petite Universe México
 2015: : Karen Lizcano

Miss Mesoamerica Internacional
 2015: : Paloma Llanes (Winner)

Reina de la Feria de San Marcos
 2010: : Karina González (Winner)

Señorita UANL
 2009: : Ángela Cantú (Winner)

Nuestra Belleza Coahuila
 2010: : Diana Ávila (2nd Runner-up)

References

External links
 Official Website

.Mexico
2011 in Mexico
2011 beauty pageants